The following lists events that have happened in 1911 in the Qajar dynasty in Iran.

Incumbents
 Monarch: Ahmad Shah Qajar
 Prime Minister: 
 until March 12: Mostowfi ol-Mamalek 
 March 12-July 26: Mohammad Vali Khan Tonekaboni 
 starting July 26: Najaf-Qoli Khan Bakhtiari

Events
 December 11 – Russian Invasion of Tabriz and two other northern cities of Iran begins.

References

 
Iran
Years of the 20th century in Iran
1900s in Iran
Iran